Coronacollina acula is a multicellular organism from the Ediacaran period resembling the Cambrian 'sponge' Choia.  The organism comprised a raised, tri-radially-symmetrical central mound with a central depression and resistant spicules (up to four in articulated fossils), which were resistant — either chitinous or biomineralized — and grew to be 37 cm long.

References

External links

Ediacaran life
Enigmatic animal taxa
Prehistoric invertebrates of Australia

Fossil taxa described in 2012